Lin Ya-hui (born 27 November 1991) is a Taiwanese footballer who plays as a midfielder for Taiwan Mulan Football League club Inter Taoyuan and the Chinese Taipei women's national team.

References

1991 births
Living people
Women's association football midfielders
Taiwanese women's footballers
Footballers from Tainan
Chinese Taipei women's international footballers
Taiwanese women's futsal players